We Don't Talk Anymore may refer to:
"We Don't Talk Anymore" (Cliff Richard song), 1979
Rock 'n' Roll Juvenile, 1979 also known in the United States as We Don't Talk Anymore
"We Don't Talk Anymore" (Charlie Puth song), 2016